Pilot Hill is the highest summit in Hampshire, England, with a maximum elevation of .

The upper slopes are open calcareous grassland, while the lower slopes are wooded.

The hill lies within the civil parishes of East Woodhay (which includes the summit), Faccombe and Combe. East Woodhay is within the district of Basingstoke and Deane in the administrative county of Hampshire, Faccombe is in the Hampshire district of Test Valley, and Combe is within the unitary authority area of West Berkshire and the ceremonial county of Berkshire.

References

Hills of Hampshire
Highest points of English counties